The Province of South Australia is an ecclesiastical province of the Anglican Church of Australia, the boundaries of which are those of the state of South Australia. The province consists of three dioceses: Adelaide, The Murray and Willochra.

The Archbishop of Adelaide is ex officio the metropolitan of the province. The position is currently (2018) held by Geoffrey Smith.

References